Hunter Gatherer is a 2016 American drama film written and directed by Josh Locy. The film stars Andre Royo, George Sample III, Kellee Stewart, Ashley Wilkerson, Kevin Jackson, Antonio D. Charity, Celestial, Alexis DeLaRosa, and Jeannetta Arnette. The film was released on November 16, 2016, by The Orchard.

Cast  
Andre Royo as Ashley Douglas
George Sample III as Jeremy Pittman
Kellee Stewart as Nat
Ashley Wilkerson as Linda
Kevin Jackson as Ray
Antonio D. Charity as Dwayne
Celestial as Ashley's Mom 
Alexis DeLaRosa as Carlos
Jeannetta Arnette as Dr. Merton
Karina Bonnefil as Santa
Mysti Bluee as Dottie
Derrick Brooks as Todd

Release
The film premiered at South by Southwest on March 12, 2016. The film was released on November 16, 2016, by The Orchard.

See also
List of black films of the 2010s

References

External links
 

2016 films
2016 drama films
2016 independent films
American drama films
American independent films
Films scored by Keegan DeWitt
2016 directorial debut films
2010s English-language films
2010s American films